Yargullen is a rural locality in the Toowoomba Region, Queensland, Australia. In the  Yargullen had a population of 25 people.

Geography 
Woodview is a neighbourhood in the south-east of the locality .

History 
The locality takes its name from the Yargullen railway station on the former Cecil Plains railway line, which was named by the Queensland Railways Department on 5 August 1915. Yargullen is an Aboriginal word meaning waterhole on plain.

Woodview Provisional School opened on 3 May 1886. It became Woodview State School on 19 January 1891 and closed on 31 December 1974. Unofficially it was known as Happy Valley School. The school was located on the Woodview School Road (approx ).

In the  Yargullen had a population of 25 people.

References 

Toowoomba Region
Localities in Queensland